Wesseh Freeman (or Weesay, 1976–2018) was a musician from Monrovia, Liberia. He became blind as a child and turned to playing the guitar to support himself and his family. He was self-taught, and built his guitars out of oil cans.

A video of him playing on the street went viral in 2016, and a Facebook page created for him garnered more than 7 million visitors. Freeman also demonstrated how he built his guitars, from an oil can, a neck shaped with a machete, and strings from bicycle cables. He said he made $4 a day playing his instrument. It brought him international attention (from people like Shane Speal) as well as funding to build him a home. He died on 27 February 2018 in a road accident in Monrovia.

References

External links
Facebook page with videos

1976 births
2018 deaths
Liberian guitarists
Male guitarists
Liberian male musicians
21st-century guitarists
21st-century male musicians
Outsider musicians
Blind musicians
Liberian blind people
Road incident deaths in Liberia
Musicians from Monrovia